Hero (2000) is a short subject film directed and written by Mark Bamford. His wife Suzanne Kay Bamford wrote and produced the film. Hero played at international film festivals and subsequently sold worldwide for television. It was filmed in Kinderhook, New York, United States.

Summary

Set during the Second World War, an American sergeant faces the dilemma of helping a German woman in difficult circumstances. A reminder of how human nature can break through the boundaries of hatred.

Cast
Alan Gelfant as Sgt. Warshaw
Julianne Nicholson as Young German Woman
Tom Tate as the Dead Nazi

Awards
 In 2001 won the Atom Films award - Director to Watch

References

External links
The film on Google Video

https://web.archive.org/web/20081025054659/http://www.nationalfestival.bahai.org.uk/film%20festival.htm

2000 films
2000 short films
American short films
Films scored by Alex Wurman
War adventure films
American World War II films
2000s English-language films